Kwaksan station is a railway station in Kwaksan-ŭp, Kwaksan County, North P'yŏngan Province, North Korea. It is on located on the P'yŏngŭi Line of the Korean State Railway.

References

Railway stations in North Korea